QSZ may refer to:

Shache Airport, IATA code QSZ
QSZ-class submersible
QSZ-92 pistol